Nadeem Iqbal (born 3 April 1983 in Rajouri district, India) is a cross-country skier from India. He competed for India at the 2014 Winter Olympics in the 15 kilometre classical race. Iqbal also became the first athlete from Jammu and Kashmir to qualify for the Winter Olympics. Iqbal finished the race in 85th position (out of 92 competitors) nearly 17 minutes behind the winner Dario Cologna of Switzerland.

See also
India at the 2014 Winter Olympics

References

External links
 

1983 births
Living people
Cross-country skiers at the 2014 Winter Olympics
Indian male cross-country skiers
Olympic cross-country skiers of India
People from Rajouri district
Skiers from Jammu and Kashmir
Cross-country skiers at the 2011 Asian Winter Games
South Asian Winter Games gold medalists for India
South Asian Winter Games medalists in cross-country skiing